Carsten Lichtlein (born 4 November 1980) is a German handball player and goalkeeper. He is a World champion from 2007 with the German national team, a European champion from 2004 and participated on the German team that finished 4th at the 2008 European Men's Handball Championship.

Club player
Lichtlein won the EHF Cup in 2006 with TBV Lemgo.

Achievements
European Championship:
: 2016

References

1980 births
Living people
German male handball players
Sportspeople from Würzburg
VfL Gummersbach players
Handball-Bundesliga players